The 2021 World Para Athletics European Championships was a track and field competition for athletes with a disability open to International Paralympic Committee (IPC) affiliated countries within Europe, plus Azerbaijan, Israel and a refugee team with one athlete. This was the 7th edition of the event. This was also the first time that the event was held in Poland. Around 670 athletes competed at the event.

History 

The event was originally scheduled to be held between 3 and 7 June 2020. On 26 March 2020, it was announced that the event would be postponed as a result of the COVID-19 pandemic, and in June it was confirmed that the postponement would be until 2021.

Venue 

The venue for the event was the Zdzisław Krzyszkowiak Stadium.

Schedule 
As of June 2021.

Summary

Medal table

Multi-medalists
Medalists who have won at least three medals or more.

Representing countries
As of 30 April 2021.

 (3)
 (4)
 (6)
 (16)
 (8)
 (1)
 (8)
 (15)
 (3)
 (25)
 (15)
 (1)
 (10)
 (40)
 (2)
 (15)
 (43)
 (31)
 (7)
 (5)
 (6)
 (2)
 (20)
 (5)
 (16)
 (1)
 (1)
 (5)
 (5)
 (17)
 (8)
 (74) Host country
 (19)
Refugee Para Team (1)
 (7)
 (80)
 (14)
 (8)
 (1)
 (43)
 (6)
 (12)
 (30)
 (31)

See also 
2020 World Para Swimming European Open Championships

References 

 
World Para Athletics European Championships
World Para Athletics European Championships
World Para Athletics European Championships
International athletics competitions hosted by Poland
Sport in Bydgoszcz
History of Bydgoszcz
World Para Athletics European Championships
2021 in disability sport
World Para Athletics European Championships